August 3 - Eastern Orthodox liturgical calendar - August 5

All fixed commemorations below are observed on August 17 by Orthodox Churches on the Old Calendar.

For August 4, Orthodox Churches on the Old Calendar commemorate the Saints listed on July 22.

Saints

 The Holy Seven Youths ("Seven Sleepers") of Ephesus:
 Maximilian, Jamblicus, Martinian, John, Dionysius, Exacustodian (Constantine), and Antoninus (250 and ca. 446)
 Martyr Eleutherius of Byzantium (early 4th century)  (see also: December 15)
 Martyr Thathuil, by hanging from an apple tree. 
 Martyr Eudokia of Anatolia, in Persia, by beheading (362)
 Martyrs Ia and 9,000 with her in Persia (363)  (see also: August 11 and September 11)

Pre-Schism Western saints

 Saint Perpetua, a matron from Rome baptised by the Apostle Peter who converted her husband and her son, St Nazarius (c. 80)
 Saint Agabius, Bishop of Verona in Italy, and Confessor (c. 250)
 Saint Tertullinus, apriest, martyred in Rome under Valerian two days after his ordination (257)
 Saints Epiphanes and Isidore, two early martyrs, venerated at the Cathedral of Besançon in France until the French Revolution.
 Saint Protasius, a martyr honoured in Cologne in Germany.
 Saint Sithney (Sezni), patron saint of Sithney, Cornwall (c. 529)
 Saint Euphronius of Tours, Bishop of Tours in France (573)
 Saints Peregrinus, Maceratus and Viventius (6th century)
 Saint Lugid of Killaloe (Lua, Molua), a disciple of St Comgall, founded many monasteries (c. 609)

Post-Schism Orthodox saints

 New Hieromartyr Cosmas of Aitolia, Equal-to-the-Apostles (1779)  (see also: August 24 - Greek)

New martyrs and confessors

 New Hieromartyr Nicholas (Prozgrov) (1930)
 New Hieromartyr Michael (Zhuk), Hieromonk of Staroye Zubarevo in Mordovia, and Martyrs Simeon and Demetrius Vorobiev of Tver (1937)

Other commemorations

 Consecration of the sacred temple of the Christ the Saviour, within the Pantocrator Monastery in Constantinople. 
 "Kazan-Penza" (Kazan of Penza) Icon of the Most Holy Theotokos (1717)  (see also: July 8)
 Uncovering of the relics (2000) of Saint Alexei Bortsurmansky (1848)  (see also: April 21)

Icon gallery

Notes

References

Sources
 August 4 / August 17. Orthodox Calendar (PRAVOSLAVIE.RU).
 August 17 / August 4. HOLY TRINITY RUSSIAN ORTHODOX CHURCH (A parish of the Patriarchate of Moscow).
 August 4. OCA - The Lives of the Saints.
 The Autonomous Orthodox Metropolia of Western Europe and the Americas (ROCOR). St. Hilarion Calendar of Saints for the year of our Lord 2004. St. Hilarion Press (Austin, TX). p. 57.
 Menologion: The Fourth Day of the Month of August. Orthodoxy in China.
 August 4. Latin Saints of the Orthodox Patriarchate of Rome.
 The Roman Martyrology. Transl. by the Archbishop of Baltimore. Last Edition, According to the Copy Printed at Rome in 1914. Revised Edition, with the Imprimatur of His Eminence Cardinal Gibbons. Baltimore: John Murphy Company, 1916. pp. 231-232.
 Rev. Richard Stanton. A Menology of England and Wales, or, Brief Memorials of the Ancient British and English Saints Arranged According to the Calendar, Together with the Martyrs of the 16th and 17th Centuries. London: Burns & Oates, 1892. pp. 379-380.

 Greek Sources
 Great Synaxaristes:  4 ΑΥΓΟΥΣΤΟΥ. ΜΕΓΑΣ ΣΥΝΑΞΑΡΙΣΤΗΣ.
  Συναξαριστής. 4 Αυγούστου. ECCLESIA.GR. (H ΕΚΚΛΗΣΙΑ ΤΗΣ ΕΛΛΑΔΟΣ).

 Russian Sources
  17 августа (4 августа). Православная Энциклопедия под редакцией Патриарха Московского и всея Руси Кирилла (электронная версия). (Orthodox Encyclopedia - Pravenc.ru).

August in the Eastern Orthodox calendar